The year 1964 was the 183rd year of the Rattanakosin Kingdom of Thailand. It was the 19th year in the reign of King Bhumibol Adulyadej (Rama IX), and is reckoned as year 2507 in the Buddhist Era.

Incumbents
King: Bhumibol Adulyadej 
Crown Prince: (vacant)
Prime Minister: Thanom Kittikachorn
Supreme Patriarch: Ariyavongsagatanana IV

 
Years of the 20th century in Thailand
Thailand
Thailand
1960s in Thailand